Dies Irae was a Polish death metal band founded in 1992. Their early recordings were heavily inspired and influenced by Vader and Morbid Angel.

Since 2005 the band is on indefinite hiatus.

Biography 

Dies Irae was formed in 1992 as very young death metal band featuring China (guitar), Mauser (guitar and vocals), Czarny (bass) and Gilan (drums). 1994 marked the recording of their debut demo titled "Fear of God" which was released by Serenades Records two years later. The demo was composed of typical death metal tracks and guitar variations as introductions. In 1997 Mauser joined the band Vader and Dies Irae split up. Four years later Mauser signed a contract with Massive Management, whose artist roster consists of such bands as Vader, Sceptic, Decapitated and many others, and started looking for new members to his band. With help of Doc (Vader), Novy (Devilyn) and Hiro (Sceptic) the band prepared material for a full debut album.

On 5 June 2000 Dies Irae entered the Selani Studio to record their debut album. Titled Immolated, it was produced by Szymon Czech, and graphically designed by Jacek Wisniewski, who had been previously responsible for several Vader's cover artworks ("Kingdom", "Black to the Blind", " Live In Japan"). Immolated was mastered at Studio 333 by Bartłomiej Kuźniak who is responsible for Vader's masters. All lyrics were written by Łukasz Szurmiński.

Following the promotional mailing of Immolated the band received a number of contract offers from labels from Europe and the United States. Finally, Dies Irae signed a four-album contract with Metal Blade Records, which represents the band around the world except Poland and Japan. In Poland they are under Metal Mind, in Japan they are represented by Avalon/Marquee Inc. Both labels also manage Vader. The debut album was released in November 2000 and its promo campaign was backed up with a video-clip for the track "Lion of Knowledge". The album itself comprises 9 cuts, including two cyber-industrial intros performed by Doc. Dies Irae are also prepared for their first European tour with Nile in January 2001.

On April/May 2002 the band entered Hertz Studio to record their second full-length album The Sin War. The date of release got rescheduled to September, because of technical problems with the CD-Masters. The album contains more complex and diverse songs, with all band members contributing to the final result. The band was forced to postpone the autumn tour due to Vader's obligations.

In July 2003 Dies Irae for the first time appeared on the stage. During the "Empire Invasion Tour 2004" they played alongside bands like Hate, Lost Soul and Esqarial. The deal with Metal Blade was terminated and shortly after the band signed a new deal with MMP, including new album and DVD releases. The third and latest effort Sculpture of Stone was recorded at Hertz Studio and includes 9 songs. The album was released in Poland on 19 May 2004 and the band hit the road again, playing 9 gigs along with bands like Trauma, Sceptic, Shadows Land. Vitek from Decapitated replaced Doc, due to his hand injury. Japanese, European and US releases of Sculpture of Stone were fixed in autumn 2004. At the beginning of 2005 at TV Studio Dies Irae shot a gig for the forthcoming DVD release and in February they hit the road along with bands like Decapitated, Hate and Crionics in "The Ultimate Domination Tour 2005".

In 2009 the band released a DVD/CD, The Art of an Endless Creation, including live footage, the band's most successful album Sculpture of Stone and bootleg recordings. The release is in part a tribute to late Drummer "Doc" who died suddenly in 2005. All members of the reconstituted Dies Irae continue to perform with other groups. Novy is a member of Nader Sadek, Mauser is playing in UnSun, while Hiro is a member of Sceptic.

Band members 

Last known line-up
Maurycy "Mauser" Stefanowicz – vocals, guitar (1992–1997, 2000–2005)
Marcin "Novy" Nowak – vocals, bass (2000–2005)
Jacek Hiro – guitar (2000–2005)
Krzysztof "Doc" Raczkowski (died 2005) – drums (2000–2005)

Former members
Jarosław "China" Łabieniec – guitar (1994–1997)
Piotr "Czarny" Bartczak – bass (1992–1997)
Maciej "Gilan" Liszewski – drums (1992–1997)

 Touring members
Witold "Vitek" Kieltyka (died 2007) – drums (2004)

Discography

References 

Polish death metal musical groups
Polish musical groups
Musical groups established in 1992
Metal Mind Productions artists
Metal Blade Records artists